President Ronald Reagan authorized the formation of his 1984 reelection campaign committee, Reagan-Bush '84, on October 17, 1983. He made the formal announcement of his candidacy for re-election on January 29, 1984.  On August 23, 1984, he secured the nomination of the Republican Party at its convention in Dallas, Texas.  The convention nominated Vice President George H. W. Bush as his running mate.

In the November 6,1984 general election, President Reagan carried 49 of 50 states, winning the election with 525 electoral votes. Reagan's opponent, Democratic Party nominee, Walter Mondale, carried only his home state, Minnesota, and the District of Columbia, receiving 13 electoral votes. President Reagan won 58.8 percent of the popular vote and Mondale received 40.6 percent. Reagan's reelection as President was confirmed by the Electoral College on December 17, 1984, and certified by the Joint session of Congress of January 7, 1985.

Chronicle

Primaries

Reagan's authorized campaign, Reagan-Bush '84, was established in October 1983 with Senator Paul Laxalt as Chairman, Edward J. Rollins as Campaign Director, and Lee Atwater as Deputy Director.  Angela "Bay" Buchanan was Treasurer and James H. Lake was Communications Director. Other long-time Reagan operatives on the 1984 campaign included Stuart K. Spencer, Richard Wirthlin, Kenneth Khachigian, Drew Lewis, and Lyn Nofziger. The Finance Chairman was Joe M. Rodgers and the Finance Director was Timothy G. Ryan.

Though there had been some speculation that Reagan would not seek a second term, he announced his candidacy for re-election in a nationally televised speech on January 29, 1984. Reagan's only opponents in the Republican primary were former Minnesota governor and perennial candidate Harold Stassen and former U.S. Special Envoy to Paraguay Ben Fernandez. The primaries were uncompetitive, as Reagan won 98.8% of the vote. Although Reagan faced only nominal opposition for the Republican nomination, the campaign did need to project Reagan's vision for a second term and mount an effective counter to the daily criticism coming from former Vice President Walter Mondale and others seeking the Democratic Party's nomination.

In May 1984, Reagan-Bush '84 launched a highly praised television ad blitz proclaiming, "It's Morning Again in America."  The ads underscored a theme at the center of Reagan's campaign: that America was "Prouder, Stronger, and Better" under President Reagan's leadership. Campaign Director Ed Rollins noted, "We wanted to remind people how things were, and how they are getting better." The campaign budgeted up to $10 million in ad buys during the period before the August Republican convention.

Reagan-Bush '84 financed its pre-convention campaign, including the television ads, with a successful fundraising effort, reaching its fundraising goals by April 1984. Finance Director Timothy G. Ryan reported raising over $26 million, with $12 million from direct mail solicitations, $4 million from fundraising events, and over $10 million in federal matching funds.  For his direct mail fundraising, Ryan used contributor lists from a number of Republican organizations that generated what was then the most successful political fundraising in American history, with an average contribution of $56.20.  Additionally, Reagan-Bush '84 was the first presidential campaign to raise enough matchable contributions ($250 and less) to qualify for the maximum amount of Federal Election Commission matching funds for the pre-convention period. Over 300,000 people contributed to the campaign.

Reagan-Bush '84 did not accept any private contributions for the post-convention, general election campaign, opting instead to receive $40.4 million in funding from the Federal Election Commission.

Republican National Convention

In August, Reagan accepted his party's nomination at the Republican National Convention in Dallas, Texas. He was, at that time, the oldest presidential nominee ever, at the age of 73 years, 6 months. In his acceptance speech, Reagan promised a "springtime of hope" for America. There were also several other main speakers, including Barry Goldwater, the Republican Party's 1964 nominee, who spoke on national defense.

Opinion polling

In January 1983, a poll showed Reagan losing to Mondale by twelve percentage points. This was attributed to the poor economy and high unemployment rates, which resulted in Reagan's approval ratings being as low as 35 percent. However, the economy "picking up" had resulted in an increase in his approval ratings, and as the election progressed, Reagan opened a large lead over Mondale in the opinion polls.

According to a poll conducted by The New York Times in September 1984, 54 percent of the voters preferred Reagan over 33 percent for Mondale. It also found that 46 percent believed that Republicans had a lead in the handling of key issues compared to Democrats, despite a large number disagreeing Reagan's views. For the favorability of the candidates, the poll found that two-thirds of the public had a positive view on Reagan, whereas only 27 percent had a favorable impression of Mondale.

Polls conducted in October and November showcased that Reagan's lead continued after the debates. Polls from Newsweek and USA Today showed Reagan ahead by 17 and 23 points, respectively. On October 30, U.S. News & World Report forecasted that the incumbent would be "on his way to a smashing victory on November 6". In November, Reagan's lead slightly decreased in the exit polls but remained substantial, with leads of 14 points and 18 points based on The Washington Post-ABC and Gallup polls respectively, the latter being similar to Reagan's final win of the popular vote by 18 points.

See also
1984 Republican National Convention
1984 United States presidential election
Second inauguration of Ronald Reagan
Walter Mondale 1984 presidential campaign
Ronald Reagan 1980 presidential campaign

References

External links 
Ronald Reagan acceptance speech

Ronald Reagan
George H. W. Bush
Reagan, Ronald
Reagan, Ronald
Presidency of Ronald Reagan